Models' Media is the fifth and final studio album by Australian rock band Models. Singles from the album were "Evolution", "Let's Kiss" and "Hold On".

Track listing
All songs written by J. Freud except where noted, according to Australasian Performing Right Association (APRA).

 "Evolution" (S. Kelly, J. Freud) - 4:02 
 "Let's Kiss" (S. Kelly) - 3:31  
 "Hold On" (S. Kelly, J. Freud) - 4:27
 "Beast O' Mine" - 4:01
 "Shootin' Train" (S. Kelly) - 4:06
 "Build It Up" - 3:45
 "Bitter Years" - 3:39
 "Sky Went Grey" (S. Kelly) - 3:22 
 "I Had a Premonition" (S. Kelly) - 4:36
 "Ghostworld" - 5:41

Chart positions

Personnel

Musicians
 James Freud - bass, vocals  
 Sean Kelly - guitar, vocals  
 Roger Mason - keyboards, vocals  
 Wendy Matthews - vocals  
 Barton Price - drums, percussion  
 James Valentine - saxophone

Production
 Paul Clarke - Photography  
 Julian Mendelsohn - Engineer  
 Mark Opitz - Producer 
 Julian Mendelsohn - Producer

References

1986 albums
Models (band) albums
Albums produced by Julian Mendelsohn
Mushroom Records albums